("sleeve wheel constriction") is a type of Judo chokehold (shime-waza), which compresses the opponent’s trachea or the carotid arteries.

Technique 
The technique can be executed from a variety of positions, but is generally performed by wrapping one arm behind the opponent’s head and grasping onto the sleeve of the gi with the opposite hand. While holding onto the sleeve for leverage, the opposite forearm is brought down across the throat and clinched tight. The choke is directly aided by the use of a gi, but it has also been adapted for no-gi application.

No-gi variation 
Since the choke relies on the leverage created by the gripping of a sleeve, it must be altered slightly to be performed without a gi. Typically, this is accomplished by using the bottom arm to grip the opposite elbow or forearm. It can also be performed without a gi using the fist or wrist instead of the forearm.

Brazilian jiu-jitsu 

Sode guruma jime is widely known as an Ezequiel choke in Brazilian Jiu-Jitsu. 

The choke became associated with the judoka Ezequiel Paraguassu from the time he spent at Carlson Gracie’s gym in Copacabana, Rio de Janeiro in 1988 while preparing for the 1988 Olympics in South Korea. While training at the gym he had a hard time trying to escape the closed guards of his opponents. Growing increasingly frustrated he decided to use the judo technique and managed to submit a number of his opponents. After a while he was asked to teach the technique to the other students and they soon began referring to it as the Ezequiel choke.

Notable uses in competition 
 The technique has been used successfully in mixed martial arts competition by Hidehiko Yoshida, a 1992 Olympic gold medalist in judo. Yoshida defeated Kiyoshi Tamura via sode guruma jime during Pride Total Elimination 2003, the opening round of Pride Fighting Championship’s 2003 grand prix. Yoshida also won a controversial decision over Royce Gracie at Pride Shockwave in 2002, when the referee thought Gracie had passed out from sode guruma jime.
 Yoshihiro Akiyama defeated Katsuyori Shibata via sode guruma jime during Dream 5 the Lightweight Grand Prix Final Round 2008.
UFC, M-1 and Bellator MMA veteran and Russian Sambo practitioner Alexey Oleinik has won fourteen fights via Ezekiel choke, including using the Ezekiel choke to defeat Viktor Pešta at UFC Fight Night 103, becoming the first fighter in the company's history to win a match using the move. He subsequently repeated successful use of the technique in his win over Júnior Albini at UFC 224 on May 12, 2018 in Brazil; the only times the move has been used to win a match in the UFC. In a YouTube interview after the fight, he claimed that his opponent's coach is also affiliated with the gym that Oleynik attends, and that Albini's preparation specifically included defense against this choke.
 Rani Yahya defeated Eben Kaneshiro by Ezekiel choke at UAGF: Kaos on Kampus on 20 May 2006.

Included systems 
Kodokan judo
Brazilian jiu-jitsu

Aliases 
Ezequiel choke 
Ezekiel choke 
Sleeve wheel choke 
Sleeve choke 
Scissor choke
Sleeve wheel constriction

References

External links
 Brazilian Jiu-Jitsu Ezekiel Choke
 Koji Komuro’s Ezekiel Choke (in Japanese) 
 No-Gi Ezekiel Choke Tutorial

Chokeholds
Judo technique